Mills House may refer to:

 Mills House (Sitka, Alaska)
 W.P. Mills House, Sitka, Alaska
 Mills House (Kensett, Arkansas)
 Mills House (Pine Bluff, Arkansas)
 Henry Clay Mills House, Van Buren, Arkansas
 Elijah Mills House, Windsor, Connecticut
 Oliver W. Mills House, Windsor, Connecticut
 Timothy Dwight Mills House, Windsor, Connecticut
 Mills House (Griffin, Georgia), a National Register of Historic Places listing in Spalding County, Georgia
 Mills House and Smokehouse, Griffin, Georgia
 William Mills House, Osawatomie, Kansas, a National Register of Historic Places listing in Miami County, Kansas
 Davis Mills House, Needham, Massachusetts
 Timothy Mills House, Morristown, New Jersey, a National Register of Historic Places listing in Morris County, New Jersey
 Mills House (Springer, New Mexico)
 Gen. William A. Mills House, Mount Morris, New York
 Mills House (New York, New York)
 Mills House (Rome, New York)
 Harriet May Mills House, Syracuse, New York
 Warren Mills House, Klamath Falls, Oregon, a National Register of Historic Places listing in Oregon
 Lewis H. Mills House (1916), Portland, Oregon
 Lewis H. Mills House (1929), Portland, Oregon
 Mills House (Fort Mill, South Carolina)
 Richard W. and Margaret Mills House, Lodi, Wisconsin
 Simeon Mills House, Madison, Wisconsin

See also
 Enos Mills Homestead Cabin, Estes Park, Colorado, a National Register of Historic Places listing in Larimer County, Colorado
 Job Mills Block, Lodi, Wisconsin
 James Mills Storehouse, Urbanna, Virginia
 Robert Mills Dairy Barn, Half Moon Bay, California, a National Register of Historic Places listing in San Mateo County, California
 Wilcox-Mills House, Marietta, Ohio, a National Register of Historic Places listing in Washington County, Ohio